The 1880 Grand National was the 42nd renewal of the Grand National horse race that took place at Aintree near Liverpool, England, on 19 March 1880.

Finishing Order

Non-finishers

References

 1880
Grand National
Grand National
19th century in Lancashire
March 1880 sports events